Automerella is a genus of moths in the family Saturniidae first described by Charles Duncan Michener in 1949.

Species
Automerella aurora (Maassen & Weyding, 1885)
Automerella flexuosa (R. Felder & Rogenhofer, 1874)
Automerella miersi Lemaire & C. Mielke, 1998

References

Hemileucinae
Moth genera